The Abbey School may refer to:
The Abbey School, Faversham
The Abbey School, Reading
The Abbey School (Tipperary), a Christian Brothers Secondary School in County Tipperary, Ireland